The teams competing in Group 1 of the 2006 UEFA European Under-21 Championship qualifying competition were Czech Republic, Netherlands, Romania, Finland, Macedonia and Armenia.

Standings

Matches
All times are CET.

Goalscorers
8 goals
 Klaas-Jan Huntelaar

6 goals
 Nicolae Mitea

4 goals

 Václav Svěrkoš
 Romeo Castelen

3 goals

 Tomáš Jun
 Michal Papadopulos
 Aco Stojkov
 Collins John
 Răzvan Cociş

2 goals

 Tomáš Jirsák
 Lukáš Magera
 Tomáš Sivok
 Filip Trojan
 Ville Lehtonen
 Njazi Kuqi
 Juho Mäkelä
 Vlatko Grozdanoski
 Costin Curelea
 Jon Jönsson

1 goal

 Tigran Gharabaghtsyan
 Samvel Melkonyan
 Roman Bednář
 Aleš Besta
 Michal Kadlec
 Martin Knakal
 David Limberský
 Daniel Pudil
 Emil Rilke
 Henri Scheweleff
 Nikola Gligorov
 Baže Ilijoski
 Aleksandar Stojanovski
 Goran Todorčev
 Mounir El Hamdaoui
 Nicky Hofs
 Julian Jenner
 Gijs Luirink
 Quincy Owusu-Abeyie
 Robin van Persie
 Lucian Burdujan
 Cosmin Moţi
 Bănel Nicoliţă
 Andrei Prepeliţă
 Gabriel Tamaş
 Ciprian Vasilache

1 own goal
 Markus Halsti (playing against Czech Republic)

External links
 Group 1 at UEFA.com

Group 1
Under
Under
Under
Under
Under
Under
Under
Under
Under
Under
Under
Under